Mount Columbia may refer to:

 Mount Columbia (Canada), on the border of Alberta and British Columbia
 Mount Columbia (Colorado), United States
 Mount Columbia (Manquin, Virginia), United States, a historic house